Tom Deery (born February 4, 1960, in Oaklyn, New Jersey) is a former American football safety.  He was elected to the College Football Hall of Fame in 1998.

1960 births
Living people
People from Oaklyn, New Jersey
Sportspeople from Camden County, New Jersey
Players of American football from New Jersey
American football safeties
Widener Pride football players
College Football Hall of Fame inductees